The 2018–19 CAF Champions League knockout stage were played from 6 April to 31 May 2019. A total of eight teams competed in the knockout stage to decide the champions of the 2018–19 CAF Champions League.

Qualified teams
The winners and runners-up of each of the four groups in the group stage advanced to the quarter-finals.

Format

Each tie in the knockout phase was played over two legs, with each team playing one leg at home. The team that scored more goals on aggregate over the two legs advanced to the next round. If the aggregate score was level, the away goals rule was applied, i.e. the team that scored more goals away from home over the two legs advanced. If away goals were also equal, then extra time was not played and the winners were decided by a penalty shoot-out (Regulations III. 26 & 27).

Schedule
The schedule of each round was as follows. Effective from the Champions League group stage, weekend matches were played on Fridays and Saturdays while midweek matches were played on Tuesdays, with some exceptions. Kick-off times were also fixed at 13:00 (Saturdays and Tuesdays only), 16:00 and 19:00 GMT.

Bracket
The bracket of the knockout stage was determined as follows:

The bracket was decided after the draw for the knockout stage (quarter-finals and semi-finals), which was held on 20 March 2019, 20:00 CAT (UTC+2), at the Marriot Hotel in Cairo, Egypt.

Quarter-finals

In the quarter-finals, the winners of one group played the runners-up of another group (teams from same group could not play each other), with the group winners hosting the second leg, and the matchups decided by draw.

Espérance de Tunis won 6–3 on aggregate.

Mamelodi Sundowns won 5–1 on aggregate.

Wydad AC won 5–0 on aggregate.

TP Mazembe won 4–1 on aggregate.

Semi-finals

In the semi-finals, the four quarter-final winners played in two ties, with the matchups and order of legs decided by draw.

Wydad AC won 2–1 on aggregate.

Espérance de Tunis won 1–0 on aggregate.

Final

In the final, the two semi-final winners play each other, with the order of legs determined by the semi-final draw.

Espérance de Tunis were declared champions after second leg was abandoned.

Notes

References

External links
Total CAF Champions League 2018/2019, CAFonline.com

3
April 2019 sports events in Africa
May 2019 sports events in Africa